The Mill Creek Historic District near Bryn Mawr and Gladwyne, Pennsylvania is a historic district that was listed on the National Register of Historic Places on December 10, 1980. The area of the historic district was increased on August 30, 1996.

The area is roughly bounded by the Schuylkill River, Mill Creek, Righter's Mill, Rose Glen, and Monk's Rds.

See also 
 National Register of Historic Places listings in Montgomery County, Pennsylvania
 Cedar Crest (Gladwyne, Pennsylvania)

References

Federal architecture in Pennsylvania
Georgian architecture in Pennsylvania
Historic districts in Montgomery County, Pennsylvania
Archaeological sites on the National Register of Historic Places in Pennsylvania
Lower Merion Township, Pennsylvania
Historic districts on the National Register of Historic Places in Pennsylvania
National Register of Historic Places in Montgomery County, Pennsylvania